Death Is Fun is a compilation album by the death metal band Necrophagia. It was released in 1995 on Red Stream records.

Track listing
"Abomination" - 4:04  
"Young Burial" - 2:02  
"Black Apparition" - 5:13  
"Chainsaw Lust" - 1:08  
"Intense Mutilation" - :44  
"Autopsy on the Living Dead" - :46  
"Witchcraft" - 2:14  
"Power Through Darkness" - 2:45  
"Young Burial" - 1:45  
"Chainsaw Lust" - 2:04  
"Autopsy on the Living Dead" - 1:05  
"Necrophagia" - 2:06  
"Vomit" - 3:25

External links
Metal Archives
Official website of the band

Necrophagia albums
1995 compilation albums